HELOA is the professional association for access, recruitment and outreach staff working in Higher Education in the UK. Its mission is to support and enable its members to help students make informed decisions.

HELOA represents over 1400 members from more than 130 universities in the UK. It is a voluntary association, led by a committee of elected officers. The aims of the Association include offering training and development opportunities to its members and providing advice and guidance about higher education to prospective students and their families. As well as a national committee, the HELOA operates a network of regional and national groups, that maintain their own group committees.

HELOA members typically work for UK universities or higher education institutions, in the fields of student recruitment, widening participation, outreach or marketing.

Much of the day-to-day administration of the HELOA is carried out by the HELOA office, which is based at Edge Hill University in Ormskirk.

Executive and UK Committee
The HELOA is led by an executive and UK committee of elected and appointed officers, each responsible for different functions of the organisation. A normal term of office is three years. The current team is as follows:
 UK Chair - Jonathan Atkinson, University of Liverpool
 UK Vice-Chair (Group Development) - Helen Walker, Sheffield Hallam University 
 UK Vice-Chair (Partnerships) - Rebecca Hollington, University of Wolverhampton
 UK Vice-Chair (Training) - Charlotte Brookes, Edge Hill University
 UK Vice-Chair (Finance) - Michelle Terrell, Edinburgh Napier University
 UK Vice-Chair (Governance & Policy) - Jo Marchant, King's College London
 UK Vice-Chair (Administration & Membership) - Harri Tatnell, Aston University

HELOA Groups
The HELOA maintains a network of nine regional and national groups.

Annual Conference and AGM
HELOA hosts an annual conference and AGM in January each year. This is a three-day event involving training sessions and networking opportunities for members and an AGM, where constitutional changes are discussed and voted upon. During this event, there is a ceremony for the annual Innovation and Best Practice Awards.

The next conference is due to take place between 24–26 January 2018 at the Crowne Plaza Hotel, Stratford-upon-Avon

Innovation and Best Practice Awards
The annual Innovation and Best Practice Awards recognise outstanding achievements of individual institutions in the fields of schools liaison, outreach and marketing. Members are asked to nominate their own projects and a shortlist and winner is decided by a panel of judges.

The first of these awards was given in 2012 to Teesside University for their Virtual Postgraduate Open Day.

Partnerships
The HELOA has formed a number of partnerships with organisations within the higher education sector.

References

Higher education organisations based in the United Kingdom
Professional associations based in the United Kingdom